Tennis in Argentina is regulated by the Asociación Argentina de Tenis (Argentine Tennis Association), which also selects the coaches of the Argentine teams for the Davis Cup and Federation Cup. There are many tennis courts in Argentina, and the sport, even though still considered middle- to upper-class, is practiced by regardless of age.

History
Although British immigrants brought the sport to Argentina, it was not until late in the 1970s that Guillermo Vilas' success made the sport popular, reaching second place in the 1975 ATP ranking. He was internationally recognised and was later included in the International Tennis Hall of Fame. During the 1980s, José Luis Clerc (4th), Alberto Mancini (8th) and Martín Jaite (10th) followed Vilas and kept interest in the sport alive. Argentina won the 1980 World Team Cup beating Italy 3–0, and reached the final of the 1980 Davis Cup, losing to United States 3–1. In the 1990s it was Gabriela Sabatini who best represented Argentine tennis, becoming an international figure on and off the court.

The boom of Argentine tennis players came in the 2000s, when many players became important in the circuit reaching high ranks. Paola Suárez won eight Grand Slam doubles between 2001 and 2005 and was, together with Spaniard Virginia Ruano Pascual, the top women's couple for three years in a row. In 2002, José Acasuso, Guillermo Cañas, Lucas Arnold and Gastón Etlis won again the World Team Cup for Argentina, this time 3–0 against Russia. Five years later, Acasuso, Juan Ignacio Chela, Agustín Calleri and Sebastián Prieto won it again, this time 2–1 against the Czech Republic. David Nalbandian lost in the final of Wimbledon in 2002. The 2004 French Open saw an Argentine final between Gastón Gaudio and Guillermo Coria. The following year's French Open saw Mariano Puerta reach the final.

Another example of the importance of the Argentine presence on the circuit was the August 2005 male rankings that counted five Argentine players among the top 12 (from 8th to 12th) of the ATP ranking, and three in the top ten of the Champions Race (5th, 8th and 9th). The 2005 Tennis Masters Cup, due to a series of last-minute resignations, had 4 Argentine players of the total of 8, with Gaudio reaching semi-finals, and Nalbandian winning the competition against #1 Roger Federer.

In 2009 Juan Martín del Potro became the first Argentinian to win the US Open since Guillermo Vilas did in 1977. Del Potro defeated world number 2 Rafael Nadal in straight sets in semifinals to reach the final and eventually beat world number 1 Roger Federer in five sets. That year Del Potro reached the final of the ATP World Tour Championship. In 2016, the Argentine Copa Davis team were crowned world champions. Juan Martín del Potro, Federico Delbonis, Leonardo Mayer and Guido Pella earned the country their first title in the sport's most important inter-country competition.

Highest-ranked players

Singles

Men

Women

Doubles

Men

Women

Best results at major tournaments
As of the 2020 French Open.

Singles

Men

Most wins against top 10 players

Team competitions

Finals

Notes

References